Gimbrède is a commune in the Gers department in southwestern France.

Geography
The river Auroue forms all of the commune's southeastern border, then flows north through its eastern part.

Population

See also
Communes of the Gers department

References

Communes of Gers